Durgapur Barrage is built across the Damodar River at Durgapur in Paschim Bardhaman district and partly in Paschim Bardhaman district, in the Indian state of West Bengal. It was constructed by Damodar Valley Corporation mainly for the purpose of irrigation and also to supply water to Industrial township of Durgapur. The irrigation and canal system was transferred to the Government of West Bengal in 1964.

Overview
The Damodar River Valley Project on the Damodar river and its principal tributary, the Konar river, is located in eastern India. The four main multipurpose dams located at Tilaiya, Konar, Maithon and Panchet were commissioned during 1953–1959. In addition, a single purpose reservoir on the main stream, the Damodar, at Tenughat was constructed later in 1974. While the four earlier dams are controlled by Damodar Valley Corporation, Tenughat Dam is controlled by the Government of Jharkhand. Durgapur Barrage, constructed downstream of all the dams, is controlled by the Government of West Bengal. Durgapur Barrage and the canal network, was handed over to the Government of West Bengal in 1964.

In 1932, the Anderson weir was constructed at Randiha. As a result, irrigation facility has been available in the lower Damodar basin before the advent of dams by means of the diversion weir on the Damodar River and Eden canal.

The barrage
It has 34 gates (including under sluice).

The canals

Location map

Durgapur water crisis 
In the night 23 November 2017, the 1st lock gate of the Durgapur Barrage was opened for some time to let the water out. After the completion of the work the gate were being lowered  when the gate got tilted and was bent. The entire water from the reservoir kept flowing out and it triggered massive water crisis as the entire Durgapur city, its large scale industries and the farm areas till the Bardhaman district are solely dependent on this single water source. The news of the tragedy was conveyed to all next morning, which caused much concern among everyone in the city. The mayor of Durgapur urged for  immediate action from Government of West Bengal following which Govt. of West Bengal sent a team of engineers to resolve the issue. Massive water scarcity had hit the Durgapur city and its adjoining areas. Electricity production was hampered. All the water contained in the reservoir was emptied and then the engineers worked all day and night and after few days the glitch was fixed by choking the lock gate region. Waters from Maithon and Panchet dams were released to fill the reservoir for supply of water. For permanent solution a new lock gate was required to be installed. To accomplish the task the engineers again wanted to empty the reservoir and later fill it up with waters from Maithon and Panchet dams yet again. This time Maithon dam expressed its inability to do so because sufficient amount of water was not available to them too. Following this a floating platform was brought to Durgapur. Using that floating platform, the lock gate was permanently fixed in phase wise manner.

The incident forced authorities to look for an alternative water source for supply of water in wake of such circumstances. Considerations are being made. A water body called Nachan Dam was selected for this purpose. Its viability and efficiency of water supply is currently being examined.

On October 31, 2020, the 31st gate of the barrage got bent because of pressure exerted by water, leading to a massive water outflow. The officials of West Burdwan and Bankura administration worry that the incident could trigger a scarcity of drinking water in both districts due to the unavailability of water in the upper catchment area. The superintendent engineer of Damodar irrigation circle is hopeful to repair or replace the gate within 48 hours as they need the upper catchment area dry to carry out the work.

References

External links
 Water Resources Information System of India
 Durgapur Barrage on Google Video

Buildings and structures in Durgapur, West Bengal
Dams in West Bengal
Barrages in India
1955 establishments in West Bengal
Dams completed in 1955
20th-century architecture in India